S-alkyl-L-cysteine sulfoxide lyase may refer to:
 S-alkylcysteine lyase, an enzyme
 Alliinase, an enzyme